Paul McCartney (born 1942) is an English singer-songwriter, multi-instrumentalist, and composer.

McCartney may also refer to:
McCartney (surname)
McCartney (album), a 1970 album by Paul McCartney
McCartney (planet), a minor planet
McCartney, Wisconsin, United States

See also
McCartney Library, an academic library of Geneva College
McCartney Productions, a holding company for the business interests of Paul McCartney